Neolamprologus buescheri is a species of cichlid endemic to Lake Tanganyika.  This species can reach a length of  TL.  It can also be found in the aquarium trade. The specific name of this cichlid honours the collector of its type, the German ichthyologist Heinz H. Büscher.

References

Konings, A., 1998. Tanganyika cichlids in their natural habitat. Cichlid Press. 272 p.

buescheri
Taxa named by Wolfgang Staeck
Fish described in 1983
Taxonomy articles created by Polbot